Des Hoyaa Pardes is a 2004 Indian Punjabi-language film, directed by Manoj Punj, starring Gurdas Maan, Juhi Chawla, Divya Dutta and Anup Soni. It won the National Award for Best Feature Film in Punjabi.

Plot 
In 1984, the former Indian Prime Minister, Indira Gandhi, was assassinated by her Sikh bodyguards, and since then the Sikhs have been a target of violent backlashes by radicals and the Punjab Police. During 1985, Gurshan Singh Somal lived a peaceful life as a farmer in rural Punjab, along with his elderly parents, Gurdev and Tejpal, and an unmarried sister, Guddi. Gurshan meets with and gets engaged to the Station House Officer's only daughter, Jassi Sandhu. Shortly thereafter her father is killed in a drive-by shooting, and a new Officer, Randhawa, takes over from him. Far from being ethical and honest, he is only concerned with fulfilling a quota of deaths of so-called terrorists by fake police encounters. Jassi and Gurshan get married as Jassi has no other relatives. When the police find a duffel bag of automatic weapons in Somal's house, they immediately arrest Gurshan and beat him up severely, even though he claims his innocence, alleging that real terrorists had forced themselves upon the family at gun-point. When a deputation from the town asks Randhawa to set him free, he does so, and the Somal family settle down. Guddi is soon to marry a young man who loves her. Then in July, 1987, Sikh terrorists gun down a bus full of non-Sikhs, setting off a shock wave in the entire country. Punjab Police are instructed to maintain order, even if it means to do away with law. A large number of Sikhs are hunted down and killed in fake police encounters, scores are arrested and tortured. Gurshan is arrested again and severely beaten up in police custody. When Guddi goes to plead with Randhawa to release him, she too is imprisoned and beaten by a burly policewoman. Gurshan's American-based friend, Darshan Singh Gill, comes to their rescue and arranges for Gurshan to visit the U.S.A. on a travel visa as a hockey player. Once in America, Gurshan applies for political asylum, and is granted one, which also permits him to sponsor Jassi, and his new-born son to America. After Jassi's arrival, Gurshan gets a job in a corner store, while Jassi works as a Gas Attendant. It is then Gurshan gets the news that his father has suffered a heart-attack and may not live long. Gurshan is ready to leave for India to be near his family in this crucial hour, but his leaving America may well revoke his political asylum, and even if he does leave America and arrives in India, there is more than a bullet from the Punjab Police awaiting him.

Music 
Jaidev Kumar composed the music for playback singers Gurdas Maan, Jagjit Singh, Sonu Nigam, Alka Yagnik, Kavita Krishnamurthy, Bhupinder Singh, Arvinder Singh and Simi.

The music was released in November of the same year.

Awards 
The film received the National Award for the best Best Feature Film in Punjabi and the actor Gurdas Maan got the Special Jury Award.

Cast

See also 
Shaheed-E-Mohabbat
Waris Shah: Ishq Daa Waaris

References

External links 

Films set in Punjab, India
Insurgency in Punjab in fiction
Punjabi-language Indian films
2000s Punjabi-language films
Films scored by Jaidev Kumar
Fictional portrayals of the Punjab Police (India)
Best Punjabi Feature Film National Film Award winners